The spinoreticular tract is an ascending pathway in the white matter of the spinal cord, positioned closely to the lateral spinothalamic tract. The tract is from spinal cord—to reticular formation— to thalamus.

It is responsible for automatic responses to pain, such as in the case of injury.

Pathway

The spinoreticular tract utilizes four levels of neurons, unlike most ascending tracts which have first- through third-order neurons.  The tract begins with first-order neurons, which immediately synapse with second-order neurons in the anterior (laminae VII and VIII) and posterior grey horns (lamina V) of the spinal column. These neurons decussate to the opposite side (anterolateral, although in the cervical region many axons remain ipsilateral), and travel up the spinal column. It terminates in the brainstem at the medullary-pontine reticular formation. Information is sent from there to the intradmedian nucleus of the thalamic intralaminar nuclei. The thalamic intralaminar nuclei project diffusely to entire cerebral cortex where pain reaches conscious level and promotes behavioral arousal. It is believed that spinoreticular tract projects to neurons having a large receptive fields that may cover wide areas of the body and play a role in the memory and in the affective (emotional) component of pain.

It is still undetermined if the spinoreticular tract possesses ipsilateral fibers in addition to those that decussate.  It is hypothesized that during development the tract was bilateral, but that the ipsilateral synapses became ineffective during development.

References

Saladin, Kenneth S.  Anatomy & Physiology: The Unity of Form and Function.  New York: McGraw-Hill.  2010.
Mense, Siegfried & Gerwin, Robert D.  Muscle Pain: Understanding and Mechanisms.  New York: Springer.  2010.
Julien N, Goffaux P, Arsenault P, et al. Widespread pain in fibromyalgia is related to a deficit
of endogenous pain inhibition. Pain 2005;114(1–2):295–302.

Further reading 
 
 

Spinal cord tracts
Sensory systems